Shahid Roudaki is a warship operated by the Navy of the Islamic Revolutionary Guard Corps of Iran that is capable of carrying aircraft, missile launchers and drones.

History
Shahid Roudaki was commissioned into service on 19 November 2020 in a ceremony attended by Major General Hossein Salami and Commander Alireza Tangsiri, commanders of the IRGC and its naval forces respectively. In line with the naming convention of the IRGC she is named after Vice-admiral Abdullah Roudaki, a martyr (Shahid) and commander of the IRGCN who was assassinated.

Previous service 
Jeremy Binnie of Jane's Defence Weekly stated that it is likely that she is the former Galaxy F, an Italian-built cargo ship launched in 1992. H. I. Sutton maintains that "we cannot say for certain, at this stage, that it is her. But Galaxy F is a strong candidate and even if not, the design is essentially identical".

Following such reports, the Italian MP Antonio Zennaro (a member of the Parliamentary Committee for the Security of the Republic) filed a formal interrogation addressing the Italian government, asking it to verify if Shahid Roudaki really was Galaxy F and—if that were the case—if the ship had been sold to the Iranians in contravention to international sanctions against dual-use technology.

Description
Chinese news agency Xinhua has described Shahid Roudaki as a light fleet carrier.

Armament 
She is equipped with one 23mm anti-aircraft gun and several heavy machine guns.
The vessel is capable of carrying helicopters and multiple armament on her deck, including drones and missiles. She is equipped with 3D phased-array radar, anti-ship missiles and electronic warfare systems. It functions as a mothership to smaller vessels, as well as a platform for launching unmanned aerial vehicles (UAV). In the footage of commissioning ceremony, a Bell 412 helicopter, four speedboats, six Ababil-2 drones, a Sevom Khordad TELAR and eight anti-ship cruise missiles in four twin container launchers (possibly of Ghader or Ghadir type) were spotted on her deck. According to H. I. Sutton, it would be unlikely for the IRGC to use the ship with such a formation of equipment in future operations because they were showcasing the asymmetrical roles and potential capability of Shahid Roudaki in the commissioning ceremony.

References

2015 ships
Ships of the Islamic Revolutionary Guard Corps